Cairo ICT is an International Telecommunication, Information Technology, Networking, Computing, Satellite & Broadcasting Trade Fair & Forum for the Middle East and Africa. Cairo ICT is one of the strongest events with regional and international presence both on the level of exhibitors or visitors. Cairo ICT provides: Business leads, Networking opportunities, Publicity and PR in regional media, Launch of new products and services, Vertical focus on selected industries. ICT stands for Information and Communication Technology.

External links 
Cairo ICT Official Website
Arab Science and Technology Foundation
Egypt - National Communication Regulatory Authority
Google to take part in Cairo ICT 2007 - AMEInfo.com
 - Ministry of Communications and Information Technology (Egypt)

Telecommunications in Egypt